The First National Bank in New Roads, Louisiana is a two-story Classical Revival-style brick building.  It was built in 1909 as the new headquarters building of the First National Bank of New Roads, which had been opened in 1905.  It cost $7,200 to build and is the only highly styled building in New Roads. 

The bank failed in 1912 and the building was occupied by the Bank of New Roads, a competitor.  It was used as a jewelry store during 1928 to 1998.  Starting in 1934, jeweler Oscar Hebert allowed a rear first floor room to serve as a community library.

References

Bank buildings in Louisiana
Neoclassical architecture in Louisiana
National Register of Historic Places in Pointe Coupee Parish, Louisiana
Buildings and structures completed in 1909